The ruble was the currency of Tajikistan between 10 May 1995 and 29 October 2000. It was ostensibly subdivided into 100 tanga, although no coins or banknotes were issued denominated in tanga. The currency was only issued as paper money, with denominations to up to 10,000 rubles.

History
Like a number of other republics of the former Soviet Union, Tajikistan continued using the Soviet and Russian rubles for a few years after independence. On 26 July 1993, when the new Russian ruble was issued, old Soviet rubles ceased to be legal tender in Russia. In Tajikistan, pre-1993 Soviet rubles ceased to be legal tender on 8 January 1994. On 10 May 1995, the Russian ruble was replaced by the Tajikistani ruble at a rate of 100:1.

Among the republics of the former Soviet Union, Tajikistan was the last to issue its own currency. Transnistria, an unrecognized state, issued its own ruble before Tajikistan did. The reason for this was largely lack of funds and resources, with Tajikistan being the poorest of the former Soviet republics and absorbing its share of the former union's economic collapse.  This was compounded further by the disorganization caused by the civil war in Tajikistan.

By the end of the decade, rampant inflation caused by economic problems had essentially destroyed the Tajikistani ruble, and plans to replace it with a new currency were drawn up in 1999.

On 30 October 2000, the somoni was introduced and replaced the ruble with 1 somoni equal to 1,000 rubles.

Coin
Only one commemorative coin was issued for the Tajikistani ruble. These were aimed for the collectors market and were never intended for use in circulation.

Banknotes
The Tajikistani ruble banknotes have a striking similarity to the 1961, 1991 and 1992 banknote series of the Soviet/Russian ruble, with similar size, colour scheme, positioning of objects and the font. The colour schemes can be traced back to the later issues of the Russian Empire. Many of the old printing templates used for the production of Soviet ruble notes were reused on Tajikistan's notes. This is because the Tajikistani ruble was printed under the direction of Goznak, the official Russian agency responsible for the production of banknotes and coins.

Historical exchange rates

See also

 Economy of Tajikistan

References

Modern obsolete currencies
Economy of Tajikistan
1995 establishments in Tajikistan
2000 disestablishments in Tajikistan
Economic history of Tajikistan
1990s economic history
Currencies introduced in 1995